Hayri Pinarci (born 10 January 1991) is a Dutch-Turkish footballer who plays for SteDoCo. He formerly played for Vitesse and AGOVV Apeldoorn.

Career

VV SteDoCo
Pinarci joined VV SteDoCo in July 2017, after the deal was announced in April.

References

External links

1991 births
Living people
Dutch people of Turkish descent
Dutch footballers
People from Boğazlıyan
SBV Vitesse players
AGOVV Apeldoorn players
SV Spakenburg players
DVS '33 players
SteDoCo players
Eredivisie players
Eerste Divisie players
Derde Divisie players
Sparta Nijkerk players
Association football midfielders